Alfredo Carrasco Candil (4 May 1875, in Culiacan – 31 December 1945, in Mexico City), was a Mexican composer.

References

1875 births
1945 deaths
People from Culiacán